Anuradha Sriram ( Mohan; born 9 July, 1970) is an Indian carnatic and playback singer and child actress who hails from the Indian state of Tamil Nadu. She has sung more than 3500 songs in Tamil, Telugu, Sinhala, Malayalam, Kannada, Bengali and Hindi films.

Early life
Anuradha was born in Chennai to playback singer Renuka Devi and Meenakshi Sundaram Mohan. She did her schooling (I and II standards) in Coimbatore at the St. Francis Anglo-Indian Girls School, and later at the Padma Seshadri Bala Bhavan, Chennai. She has a B.A and M.A in music from Queen Mary's College in Madras University and secured the university gold medal in both the courses. She was given a fellowship to do her Master of Arts degree in Ethnomusicology and Composition from Wesleyan University, Connecticut, US.

She was trained by many esteemed gurus like Thanjavur S. Kalyanaraman, Sangeetha Kalanidhi T. Brinda and T. Viswanathan in Carnatic music and has had intensive training under Pandit Mannikbua Thakurdas for Hindustani classical music. She is also an accomplished Western Classical opera singer, having undergone intensive training from Prof. Shirley Meier in New York City.

While in Wesleyan, apart from learning and performing western opera and jazz, she also performed in many Indonesian and West African music concerts.

Career
Anuradha has performed extensively all over India and the US, and has given many radio and TV programmes since the age of 12. Anuradha Sriram first entered the Tamil Cinema Industry as a child artist in the 1980 Tamil film Kaali. In 1995, she was introduced as a singer by A R Rahman for the song "Malarodu Malaringu" in the movie Bombay. Her first solo was for A R Rahman in Indira.

She specialises in Carnatic music and has sung in over 1,000 concerts worldwide.

Anuradha has several chart-topping Devotional albums to her credit. She also collaborates with her husband Sriram Parasuram on their Classical Music Jugalbandhi concerts and their hit TV programme "Elaame Sangeetham Thaan". She has also presented many music programmes on TV.

Having sung more than 2,000 songs in Tamil, Telugu, Kannada, and Malayalam, and six North Indian languages, some of her hits are "Nalam Nalam Ariyaaval" (Kaadal Kotai), "Dilruba Dilruba" (Priyam), "Meenamma" (Aasai), "Acham Acham Illai" (Indira), "Phenk Hawa" (Ram Jaane) and "Pehli Pehli" (Zor).

She has composed music for the film Five Star and television series Sivamayam produced by Radaan for Sun TV along with her husband. She also worked as a voice actor lending her voice for Kiran for the film Anbe Sivam (2003).

Awards and recognition

 Dr. J. Jayalalitha Cine Award (1996)
 Ajanta Award for the best female playback singer (1996)
 Screen Videocon award for Best Pop Album (1998)
 Karnataka State Film Awards for best playback singer (1999)
 Vocational Excellence Award by the Rotary Club of Coimbatore Midtown (2002)
 International Tamil Film Awards (2003)
 West Bengal State award for best playback singer (2004)
 Filmfare award for the best playback singer (2004) - O Podu from Gemini
 Honorary Doctorate by the Sathyabama University for her accomplishments and contribution to the field of music (2012)

Albums 

 Chennai Girl (1997)

Personal life
Anuradha is married to singer Sriram Parasuram (whom she met at Wesleyan University). They have two sons named Jayant and Lokesh.

Anuradha's brother Murugan is also a playback singer.

Television

References

External links
 

1970 births
Living people
Bollywood playback singers
Indian women classical singers
Singers from Chennai
Kannada playback singers
Tamil playback singers
Wesleyan University alumni
Filmfare Awards South winners
Recipients of the Kalaimamani Award
Women Carnatic singers
Carnatic singers
Malayalam playback singers
Telugu playback singers
20th-century Indian singers
20th-century Indian women singers
21st-century Indian women singers
21st-century Indian singers
Women musicians from Tamil Nadu
Indian women playback singers